Cốc Cốc browser (meaning "knock knock" and previously Cờ Rôm+) is a freeware web browser focused on the Vietnamese market, developed by Vietnamese company Cốc Cốc and based on Chromium open source code. Cốc Cốc is available for Windows, Windows Phone, Android, and macOS operating systems and supports both English and Vietnamese. Cốc Cốc also has its own search engine service.

History
The first version of the browser was presented under the brandname Cờ Rôm+ on 4 December 2012 (Cờ Rôm being the informal Vietnamese pronunciation for Chrome). At that time, the interface of Cốc Cốc was similar to that of Google Chrome, but the browser had already integrated two features: the ability to download files to multiple streams and the storage of media content

Two months after the official release, the number of Cốc Cốc users in Vietnam surpassed Opera and later Safari and Internet Explorer.

On 2 April 2014, Cờ Rôm+ was officially re-branded as the Cốc Cốc browser to unify the company's brands under that name: Cốc Cốc Search Engine, Cốc Cốc browser and Nhà Nhà mobile app.

In October 2017, Cốc Cốc reached more than 22 million users and ranked as the second most popular browser in Vietnam after Google Chrome.

Features
Cốc Cốc has a mechanism to perform reverse domain name resolution, allowing the bypassing of blocked websites (including Facebook) on DNS. This feature debuted on 14 May 2013, in the first official release of the browser.

Cốc Cốc is equipped with a system that automatically adds lingual tone to Vietnamese text. It allows the user to enter Vietnamese text without the need for applications like Unikey, EVkey and Vietkey. When users type any text without tone, Cốc Cốc will suggest the most likely variants of tone arrangements, once processed on the Cốc Cốc server.

Cốc Cốc incorporates an English-Vietnamese dictionary, assisting English learners or international newspaper subscribers from elementary to the advanced level. When users double click on any English word, a small box will appear on site, showing meaning and pronunciation of the word.

Cốc Cốc is able to find media content (audio, video) on most streaming websites and save it to the computer for viewing or listening offline, by one click on an icon on the toolbar. Except for several premium websites, all popular streaming websites, for example, YouTube and Dailymotion, are downloadable on the browser.

Unlike Google Chrome, which removes and cancels all pending downloads when the browser is closed, Cốc Cốc saves and resumes partial downloads (assuming that the server hosting the file supports this feature).

Market share

According to data published by StatCounter in October 2021, use of Cốc Cốc surpassed Firefox and, with a share of 12.82%, became the second most used browser in Vietnam after Google Chrome (also based on Chromium), at 70.9% (combined at 74.88%). Also according to data published by StatCounter in October 2021, Cốc Cốc had overtaken Internet Explorer and Firefox to become one of the top browsers in Vietnam.

User feedback and issues
In 2021, the ex-CEO of Cốc Cốc confessed that at least from 2017, the company was engaged in selling advertising to illegal gambling websites and other activities suspected to have criminal nature.

References

External links
 

Vietnamese software
Internet in Vietnam
Web browsers
Vietnamese brands
2013 software
Information technology companies of Vietnam